Cuéntame is the ninth studio album released by Spanish singer Rosario Flores. The album contains the version of the song "" used as the main theme song of the 11th season of the Spanish television drama series Cuéntame cómo pasó. The album was nominated for a Latin Grammy Award for Best Female Pop Vocal Album in 2010.

Track listing
This information adapted from Allmusic.

References

2009 albums
Rosario Flores albums
Spanish-language albums